Doximity is an online networking service for medical professionals. Launched in 2010, the platform offers its members curated medical news, telehealth tools, and case collaboration.

History 
The company was launched in March 2011 by co-founders Nate Gross, Jeff Tangney and Shari Buck.

By 2013, it became one of the largest networks for U.S. healthcare professionals, with approximately 10 percent of U.S. doctors as members. By the beginning of 2014, 40 percent of U.S. physicians became members. In 2018, the company announced that it had reached 1 million members, accounting for more than 70 percent of U.S. physicians. Today, Doximity serves more than 2 million registered members, including over 80 percent of U.S. physicians and over 50 percent of nurse practitioners and physician assistants.

In 2016, the company was ranked #6 on the Deloitte Technology Fast 500 list.

In November 2019, Doximity was listed on the Deloitte Technology Fast 500 list for the fourth consecutive year.

In May 2020, Doximity Launched Dialer Video, a video telehealth app allowing physicians to video call patients through personal smartphones.

In June 2020, Doximity Acquires THMED and launches the Curative Brand. Curative is a staffing and recruiting company offering permanent and Locum/Temporary placement services.

In May 2021, Doximity, a professional network for physicians with telehealth and scheduling tools, filed for an initial public offering (IPO) seeking to raise $100 million. Morgan Stanley, Goldman Sachs and J.P. Morgan Securities were the lead underwriters for the IPO. Doximity raised nearly $606 million in its IPO.

Investors 
In April 2014, the company announced it had raised a $54 million financing round led by the venture capital firm Draper Fisher Jurvetson and the mutual fund company T. Rowe Price. Morgan Stanley Investment Management also invested. This investment brought Doximity's total funding to $81 million.

Doximity received $10.8 million in venture capital funding from Emergence Capital Partners and Interwest Partners in March 2011, and $17 million in Series B funding led by Morgenthaler Ventures in September 2012.

Products

Dialer
In 2016, Doximity built Dialer, a free communication tool for physicians to call their patients. The Doximity Dialer app allows physicians to call patients from their personal cell phone, and the patient sees the doctor's office number on caller ID.

Dialer Video
In May 2020, Doximity released Dialer Video, a telemedicine tool that allows physicians to video call their patients directly from their own smartphones.

In July 2020, Doximity announced more than 100,000 U.S. Doctors use Dialer Video, its telemedicine app.

Acquisition 
In June 2020, Doximity acquired THMED, a healthcare company. Following the purchase, THMED changed its name to Curative and started concentrating on customized medical-personnel queries.

References

External links

Professional networks
Internet properties established in 2011
American social networking websites
Online companies of the United States
Companies based in San Mateo, California
Medical professional networks
Health care companies based in California
Software companies based in the San Francisco Bay Area
Technology companies established in 2011
Software companies of the United States
2011 establishments in the United States
2011 establishments in California
Software companies established in 2011
Companies established in 2011
Companies listed on the New York Stock Exchange
2021 initial public offerings